Osvaldoginella fluctuata is a species of very small sea snail, a marine gastropod mollusk or micromollusk in the family Cystiscidae.

Description

Distribution

References

 Espinosa J. & Ortea J. (2018). Nuevas especies cubanas del género Osvaldoginella Espinosa & Ortea, 1977 (Gastropoda: Cystiscidae). Avicennia. 23: 45-50.

External links
 McCleery T. & Wakefield A. (2007). A review of the enigmatic genus Canalispira Jousseaume, 1875 (Gastropoda: Cystiscidae) with the description of three new species from the western Atlantic. Novapex. 8(1): 1-10

fluctuata
Gastropods described in 2007